Redbus  or Red Bus refer to:

Corporate
 Redbus Investments, formed by Cliff Stanford in the United Kingdom
 Redbus Interhouse, a data- centre colocation operator in Europe
 Redbus Internet Exchange, formerly operating between Interhouse's data centres
 Redbus Film Distribution, movie underwriter in the United Kingdom now under Lionsgate

Bus operators
 Midland Red Buses, a former provider in the West Midlands of England
 Red Bus (New Zealand), an operator in Christchurch
 Redbus.in, an Indian bus-based travel agency
 Red Bus Services, an Australian transport operator
 Red Jammers, an American red bus service at Glacier National Park, United States

Other
 Red Bus (Mendoza), transport payment system used in Argentina

See also
 AEC Routemaster bus design, painted red and synonymous with transport in London, United Kingdom
 BEST Transport division, Mumbai, based on London